Howmeh Rural District is a rural district (dehestan) in the Central District of Iranshahr County, Sistan and Baluchestan province, Iran. At the 2006 census, its population was 25,686, in 5,068 families.  The rural district has 66 villages. At the 2016 census, its population had risen to 46,162.

References 

Iranshahr County
Rural Districts of Sistan and Baluchestan Province
Populated places in Iranshahr County